Paradidactylia ovatulus, is a species of dung beetle found in Nepal, Sri Lanka, India and Java.

References 

Scarabaeidae
Insects of Sri Lanka
Insects of India
Insects described in 1861